Entoloma decastes is a species of mushroom in the family Entolomataceae. Found in Italy, it was described as a new species in 2009. The fungus fruits in dense clusters in sandy soil, in coastal grassland. The thick gills are crowded close together, and initially greyish before turning pinkish brown. Spores measure 11–14 by 9–12 µm.

See also
List of Entoloma species

References

External links

Entolomataceae
Fungi of Europe
Fungi described in 2009
Taxa named by Machiel Noordeloos